Laisam Simai is an Indian politician from the state of Arunachal Pradesh.

Simai was elected from the Nampong constituency in the 2014 Arunachal Pradesh Legislative Assembly election, standing as a BJP candidate.

Laisam Simai is one of the youngest MLAs, in Arunachal Pradesh. He comes from a remote village known as New Kamlao which is under Manmao Circle in the eastern part of Arunachal Pradesh.

References

External links
 Laisam Simai profile
 MyNeta Profile
 Janpratinidhi Profile

Living people
Bharatiya Janata Party politicians from Arunachal Pradesh
Arunachal Pradesh MLAs 2019–2024
Arunachal Pradesh MLAs 2014–2019
Year of birth missing (living people)